Mount Waterman is a ski area on Waterman Mountain in the San Gabriel Mountains of the Angeles National Forest in Los Angeles County, California. Mount Waterman is leased under a special use permit from the United States Forest Service. Skiable terrain is distributed as: 20% beginner, 20% intermediate, and 60% advanced.

History

Mount Waterman is a ski area on Waterman Mountain in the San Gabriel Mountains of the Angeles National Forest in Los Angeles County, California. A large tract of land in the San Gabriel Mountains was leased from the United States Forest Service in 1888 to master trailblazer and cabin builder Louis Newcomb. Robert B. Waterman was a pioneer mountain man and a ranger in the San Gabriel Forest Reserve. Waterman, together with his wife Liz and their friend Perry Switzer, completed a three-week hike from La Cañada to the Antelope Valley and back in May 1889. With this epic feat, Liz became the first white (non Indigenous) woman known to have crossed the San Gabriels. Along the way, she placed a cairn on this summit, and christened it "Lady Waterman's Peak". However, attitudes toward women at the time led to this name being considered inappropriate. The peak was subsequently referred to by different names, all of which left out the "Lady". To his credit, Robert Waterman made numerous, futile efforts to have the full name restored.

Beginnings
Lynn Newcomb, Sr. and his sons Ren Newcomb and Lynn Newcomb, Jr. built the first rope tow in the area in 1939. Mount Waterman claims to have had the first chairlift in California, opened by the Newcombs on January 1, 1941. The chairlift broke down during opening day and riders had to jump off, but the resort continued to operate.

Lynn Newcomb, Jr. took over the operation after his father's death. Until 1968, the area retained its single chair, chair lift and three rope tows from 1941. Then chair number two was added, a fixed grip double. The 1968–69 season brought extensive snowfall. The original single was replaced in 1972 with a fixed grip double. In 1981, chair three was added. Lynn Jr. ran the ski area for all but a two-year period, until the 1990s, when it was sold to two San Gabriel Valley businessmen. Those new owners returned the resort to Newcomb when their ambitious plans for snowmaking and other improvements at the ski area fell through.

Angeles Crest Resorts (ACR)

Newcomb sold Mount Waterman to a group of Southern California businessmen, the main investors being Barry R. Stubblefield of Valencia, owner of a lighting business, and his brother Gregory R. Stubblefield of Pasadena a United Way benefactor and regional president and chairman of Enterprise Rent-A-Car), James "Jim" R. Newcomb,  and Charles "Chuck" W. Ojala  both also residing in Valencia.). Together they formed Angeles Crest Resorts (ACR) and operated Mount Waterman and neighboring Snowcrest ski area beginning in 1999.

The resort did not operate between July 2001 and February 2008, mostly due to a failure to meet U.S. Forest Service operating requirements. Mount Waterman has higher natural snowfall (average 180 inches) than most Southern California ski areas and its snow is fairly well preserved by tree shading and steep north exposure. However, the snowfall is very erratic and with no snowmaking equipment, the area was unable to operate in dry years such as the 2001–2002 season. Mount Waterman's commercial appeal is also limited by its topography: there is a beginner area up top, and abundant steep glades for experts, but very limited terrain for intermediate skiers.

In January 2005, Barry R. Stubblefield, who was digging out Waterman after a snowstorm, died while skiing with two ski patrol members when he fell and tumbled out of control until he hit a tree, according to Sgt. Don Hudalla of the Los Angeles County Sheriff's Crescenta Valley Station. He was 48.

2004–2005 season
The Southern California region had nearly record breaking precipitation the winter of 2004-05. Los Angeles almost broke its highest record for precipitation. In February 2005 there was  snowpack, and then another  of powder fell. This information was obtained from the caretaker at Mount Waterman via mobile phone. This snowpack rivaled the record El Niño years of 1982-83 and 1997–98, but in 2004–05 the area was still not open to the public. Stories of long hikes up the closed Angeles Crest Highway to Cloudburst Summit, then onto the buried lodge, are remembered by a select few. One snowfall that year reached the bull wheel at the base of chair one. The top of one was merely a mound of snow with a channel cut through, while the lodge was completely buried.

Mount Waterman LLC
On July 2, 2006, the Pasadena Star-News reported that Rick Metcalf, an associate of Lynn Newcomb, and longtime Waterman skier, had formed Mount Waterman LLC and purchased the Mount Waterman and Kratka Ridge ski areas and was securing operating permits with the goal of reopening Mount Waterman for the 2006-2007 ski season. 2006–07 was the driest season in Los Angeles history so Mount Waterman never had enough snow to open. A new Mount Waterman web site launched on January 11, 2008, published a notice that set an opening date in early February.

February 2008 reopening
Mount Waterman officially reopened February 16, 2008. Over 200 skiers attended. Chairs one and two were operational largely due to the efforts of a few dedicated locals who dug through ice and dirt to clear the loading zones; chair three was still being dug out from recent snowfall. The Metcalfs, other owners, and press were in attendance, as well as former owner Lynn Newcomb. The resort operated for approximately five weeks on a limited, weekend schedule (Saturdays and Sundays), closing in mid-March 2008. The snow pack had melted to patches by mid-May, only to revive in a Memorial Day weekend storm that left over two feet of snow.

2008–2009 season
Mount Waterman operated during the 2008/2009 ski season with all three lifts running, and the resort received over 3 feet of snow in December. Conditions throughout the season were variable due to warm weather patterns and winter rain, and the resort usually operated on a Friday-Sunday schedule from December 21 - January 12, then again from February 13 - March 15. Resort facilities received improvements, highlighted by the reopening of the lodge.

Station Fire
The Station Fire (2009) exploded out of control on August 29–30, 2009, and was visible to Mount Waterman caretaker Todd Brugger several miles west of the ski area. Phone service was lost early in the fire, so Brugger had to respond on his own. After seeing smoke coming from Devil's Canyon directly behind the ski area, he took a bulldozer up to the ridgeline and dumped some dirt off the back to form a firebreak. On September 5, the fire reached Devil's Canyon close to Todd's firebreak. In the Winston side country west of the ski area, the fire crossed the ridge and burned some ground cover but not the forest. On September 6, firefighters finally arrived on the scene, deploying a plane with fire retardant. The Station Fire's most serious impact upon Mount Waterman was the closure of the Angeles Crest Highway above La Canada for all of the 2009-10 and 2010-11 ski seasons.

2009–2010 and later seasons
 2009-2010: Mount Waterman had enough snow for skiing by late January 2010 but no road access. An alternate route through Big Tujunga Canyon was finally opened in March, so Mount Waterman operated on its Friday-Sunday schedule from March 13–April 18. 
 2010-2011: In 2011, Mount Waterman was again accessible via the Big Tujunga route. It was open the first two weekends of January, then Friday-Sunday from February 27–April 3, except for the third weekend of March when there was too much snow for the road to be plowed.
 2011-2015: The Angeles Crest Highway above La Canada finally reopened in May 2011, restoring normal road access to Mount Waterman. However, for the 2011–12, 2012–13, 2013–14 and 2014–15 seasons, natural snowfall was inadequate to open the ski area for business. The multi-year drought was unprecedented in the 70+ years of the ski area's history; it had never been closed previously for more than two consecutive seasons.
 2015-2016: Mt. Waterman was open weekends from Jan. 16 - Feb. 6.
 2016-2017: Mt. Waterman was open weekends from Jan. 28 - Mar.  12. 
 2017-2018: This year was another severe drought season so Mt. Waterman never opened.
 2018-2019: Mt. Waterman was open the weekend of Feb. 23-24 and the last three weekends of March.  Road damage prevented Mt. Waterman from being open Feb. 9-10, and a detour via Upper Big Tujunga was required to reach the area during the later open weekends.
 2019-2020:   Mt. Waterman received adequate snow from the Christmas storm but its road was closed for several days and there were further equipment delays. So it opened for the last two weekends of January but then closed.  Due to the COVID-19 pandemic there was no possibility of running lifts after the March or April storms.  But Mt. Waterman and the upper Angeles Crest was quite active with backcountry skiers after the April 6-10 storm until the heat wave hit a week and a half later.
 2020-2021:  Mt. Waterman did not open in  2020-21 because Hwy 2 was closed for Bobcat Fire cleanup plus the fires damaged phone lines to the ski area.
 2021-2022:  Mt. Waterman's road was closed for a week after the December storms and it did not have staff and equipment ready until February, when snowpack was inadequate to open.  This was the 8th season out of the past 16 that Mt. Waterman never opened.

In 2010 Mt. Waterman partnered with GP, the largest DH mountain bike group in the US, to create a summer program. Upon permit approval, this will include a managed bike park in the year-round plan.

Facilities

Near the top there is a 5 million gallon, tadpole-filled reservoir intended for a future snowmaking system, and at the  summit there is a plateau with large boulders. Waterman has three double chairlifts to serve its ski trails. Mount Waterman currently has no snowmaking equipment. There are steep backcountry ski trails on the east and northwest sides of the mountain, though skiing these trails is not recommended since the area is not patrolled. During heavy El Niño snowfall in 1998 the County Sheriff ticketed some backcountry skiers who entered these areas. Several skiers and snowboarders went missing and had to be rescued that year.

See also
Angeles National Forest
Buckhorn Ski Club
Kratka Ridge
San Gabriel Mountains National Monument

References

External links
Mount Waterman official web site
Mount Waterman Ski Patrol
Mt. Waterman and Kratka Ridge Article
Southland Ski Server-Mount Waterman
Newcomb's Ranch
SoCal Skiing History
The Angeles National Forest site from the USDA Forest Service
Los Angeles Times Article,"It's all about character "
Los Angeles Daily News Article, "Death of coach left team at a loss", about then owner Barry Stubblefield.
Los Angeles Times article, "Rebirth of a pioneer gives skiers a lift", regarding February 16 re-opening.
Skier's Guide to Mount Waterman, article and photos

Ski areas and resorts in California
Angeles National Forest
Waterman
Sports venues in Los Angeles County, California
Tourist attractions in Los Angeles County, California